The  or  is a Japanese pangram, authored in the 9th century AD, which is credited as being the oldest perfect pangram in the Japanese language. Its name roughly translates to "Song (or Words) of the Universe".

The text

The text of the pangram written in hiragana (including the now archaic ゐ wi and ゑ we as well as the also archaic 𛀁 ye. ん n is not included as it had not been invented yet)

あめ つち ほし そら
やま かは みね たに
くも きり むろ こけ
ひと いぬ うへ すゑ
ゆわ さる おふせよ
えの 𛀁を なれゐて

The text of the pangram written in kanji:

天  地  星  空
山  川  峰  谷
雲  霧  室  苔
人  犬  上  末
硫黄  猿  生ふせよ
榎の枝を  慣れ居て

The text of the pangram written in Hepburn romaji:

Ame tsuchi hoshi sora
Yama kaha mine tani
Kumo kiri muro koke
Hito inu uhe suwe
Yuwa saru ofuseyo
Eno yewo narewite

A rough and necessarily nonsensical English translation:

Heaven, earth, star, sky,
Mountain, river, ridge, valley,
Cloud, fog, mudhouse, moss,
Person, dog, top, end,
Sulfur, monkey, grow!
Hackberry branch! Keep getting more familiar!

See also

 Iroha
 Japanese literature

Japanese literature